Hyloconis puerariae is a moth of the family Gracillariidae. It is known from the island of Hokkaido in Japan and the Russian Far East.

The wingspan is 5.5-6.5 mm.

The larvae feed as leaf miners on Pueraria lobata, Lespedeza bicolor, Amphicarpaea bracteata and Amphicarpaea edgeworthii var. japonica. The mine is orthogenous, entirely flat and found on the lower surface of the leaf. The cocoon is orbicular in form, white and spun in the centre of the mine-cavity.

References

Lithocolletinae
Moths of Japan

Moths described in 1963
Taxa named by Tosio Kumata
Leaf miners
Insects of Russia